Joanna Siedlecka (born 24 February 1949 in Białystok, Poland)  is a  writer, reporter, journalist, member of the Polish Writers Association (Stowarzyszenie Pisarzy Polskich), and the author of 10 books, 4 collections of essays and 6 biographies, notably, about the lives of writers: Witold Gombrowicz, Witkacy, and Jerzy Kosiński. Siedlecka is a lecturer at M. Wańkowicz College in Warsaw.

Works

Collections of Reportage

 Stypa (1981)
 Poprawiny (1984)
 Parszywa sytuacja (1984)
 Jaworowe dzieci (1991)

Biographies by Joanna Siedlecka
 Jaśnie Panicz (1987) , about Witold Gombrowicz
 Mahatma Witkac (1992) , about Witkacy
 Czarny ptasior (1993) , about Jerzy Kosiński
 Wypominki (1996), 
 Pan od poezji (2002) , about Zbigniew Herbert
 Wypominków ciąg dalszy, 
 The Ugly Black Bird, about Jerzy Kosiński

Awards
 "Ksawery Pruszyński’s Prince of Reportage" (1976)
 "Polish Writers Association Award" (1978, 1980)
 "Leszek Prorok Award for Literature" (2000)
 "Warsaw Literary Premiere Award" (twice) for books Jaśnie Panicz and Pan od poezji.

References

 nt. Zb.Herberta - strona WWW lwowiaków
 Leszek Żuliński o "Obławie" Joanny Siedleckiej

1949 births
Living people
Polish women writers